Make My Day may refer to:

Music 
 "Make My Day" (T.G. Sheppard and Clint Eastwood song), 1984
 "Make My Day" (Mai Kuraki song), 2002
 "Make My Day" (Martin Vučić song), 2005
 "Make My Day" (Yui Aragaki song), 2008
 "Make My Day", a song by Labi Siffre from his 1970 self-titled debut album
 "Make My Day", a song by Motörhead from the 1991 album 1916
 "Make My Day", a song by Gotthard from the 1996 album G.
 "Make My Day", a song by Waldeck from the 2007 album Ballroom Stories
 Make My Day, a 2010 album by Maria Haukaas Storeng, or the title song
 Make My Day, a 2012 EP by Pia

Other uses 
 Make My Day Law or the Castle Doctrine, an American legal doctrine regarding the use of deadly force in one's residence
 "Go ahead, make my day", a catchphrase used by the fictional film character Dirty Harry Callahan, portrayed by Clint Eastwood
 Make My Day, a 2009 program broadcast by TV Land
 "Make My Day", the twenty-third episode of the 2005 children's television series, Muffin the Mule
 Make My Day (TV series), an anime series produced by 5 Inc. and Netflix